6522 Aci is an elongated Phocaea asteroid from the inner regions of the asteroid belt. It was discovered on 9 July 1991, by American astronomer Eleanor Helin at Palomar Observatory in California, United States. It was named for the Jaci river at Acireale in Italy, and refers to the myth of Acis and Galatea.

Orbit and classification 

Aci is a member of the Phocaea family, a relatively small group of stony asteroids with similar orbital characteristics. It orbits the Sun in the inner main-belt at a distance of 1.9–2.9 AU once every 3 years and 8 months (1,345 days). Its orbit has an eccentricity of 0.20 and an inclination of 22° with respect to the ecliptic.

Naming 

This minor planet was named for the Jaci river near Acireale, southeast of Mount Etna in Sicily, Italy. Other towns and villages along the river, such as Aci Castello, Aci Trezza, and Aci Sant'Antonio, were also honored. The river's name refers to the myth Acis and Galatea from Greek mythology, which is about a young Sicilian shepherd, who was killed by the jealous cyclops Polyphemus, because of his love for the sea nymph Galatea. The minor planet 74 Galatea is named after this Nereid. The  was published by the Minor Planet Center on 26 October 1996 .

Physical characteristics

Rotation period 

In September 2010, a rotational lightcurve of Aci was obtained from photometric observations taken at the Palomar Transient Factory in California. Lightcurve analysis gave a rotation period of  hours with a brightness variation of 0.68 magnitude.

Diameter and albedo 

According to the NEOWISE mission of NASA's Wide-field Infrared Survey Explorer, Aci measures 6.1 kilometers in diameter and its surface has a high albedo of 0.39, while the Collaborative Asteroid Lightcurve Link assumes an albedo of 0.23 – which derives from 25 Phocaea, namesake and largest member of this orbital family – and calculates a diameter of 5.7 kilometers with an absolute magnitude of 13.45.

References

External links 
 Lightcurve Database Query (LCDB), at www.minorplanet.info
 Dictionary of Minor Planet Names, Google books
 Asteroids and comets rotation curves, CdR – Geneva Observatory, Raoul Behrend
 Discovery Circumstances: Numbered Minor Planets (5001)-(10000) – Minor Planet Center
 
 

006522
Discoveries by Eleanor F. Helin
Named minor planets
19910709